The 2013–14 Denver Pioneers men's basketball team represented the University of Denver during the 2013–14 NCAA Division I men's basketball season. The Pioneers, led by seventh year head coach Joe Scott, played their home games at Magness Arena and were first year members of The Summit League. They finished the season 16–15, 8–6 in The Summit League play to finish in fourth place. They advanced to the semifinals of The Summit League tournament where they lost to North Dakota State.

Roster

Schedule
 
|-
!colspan=9 style="background:#880029; color:#D0CCAE;"| Regular season

|-
!colspan=9 style="background:#880029; color:#D0CCAE;"| The Summit League tournament

References

Denver Pioneers men's basketball seasons
Denver